Open Slavery existed in Kuwait until the 1940s. Slavery was formally abolished in Kuwait in 1949.

History

In the 1890s, the British Empire gained control over the area. However, the British did not interfere with the inner policy of the state, but was content with keeping peace with the indigenous power holders, protecting British citizens, and managing the contacts with the international community, in which they assured that Kuwait obeyed the same international treaties signed by the British themselves.

Slave trade
During the Omani Empire (1692-1856), Oman was a center of the Zanzibar slave trade. Slaves were trafficked from the Swahili coast of East Africa via Zanzibar to Oman. From Oman, the slaves were exported to the rest of the Arabian Peninsula and Persia, including the Trucial States, Qatar, Bahrain and Kuwait. The Omani slave trade from Africa started to shrink in the late 19th-century. 

A second route of slave trade existed, with people from both Africa and East Asia, who were smuggled to Jeddah in the Arabian Peninsula in connection to the Muslim pilgrimage, Hajj, to Mecca and Medina. Victims were tricked to perform the journey willingly in the belief that they were going on the Hajj pilgrimage or employed as servants and then sold upon arrival. The method of kidnapping was also used. These slaves were then exported from the Hejaz to Oman, the Trucial States, Qatar, Bahrain and Kuwait. 

In the 1940s, a third slave trade route was noted, in which Balochis from Balochistan were shipped across the Persian Gulf, many of whom had sold themselves or their children to escape poverty. 

In 1943, it was reported that Baloch girls were shipped via Oman and the Trucial States to Mecca, where they were popular as concubines, since Caucasian girls were no longer available, and were sold for $350-450.

Function
Female slaves were used as domestic servants and as concubines (sex slaves), while male slaves were primarily used within the pearl industry as pearl divers.

Activism against slave trade

The British Empire, having signed the 1926 Slavery Convention, was obliged to fight slavery and slave trade in all land under direct or indirect control of the British Empire. Since Kuwait were formally under British control, the British were expected to enforce this policy in the region. Officially, the British declared that they did just that, but in reality, the slavery and slave trade was tolerated by the British. 

The British considered their control over the region insufficient to do something about the slavery and the slave trade. The British policy was therefore to assure the League of Nations that Kuwait followed the same anti slavery treaties signed by the British, but in parallel prevent any international observations of the area, which would disprove these claims. 

In both 1932 and 1935, the British colonial authorities refused to interfere in the slavery of the Trucial States, Qatar, Bahrain and Kuwait, since they were afraid that they could lose control over the area if they should attempt to enforce a policy against slavery, and they therefore prevented all international observations of the area which could force them to take action.  

In 1935, the British authorities thus assured the League of Nations that with the exception of Kuwait, all the British controlled states by the Persian Gulf, such as the Trucial States, Qatar and Bahrain had banned the slave trade due to treaties with the British, but while at the same time, the British refused any international inspections in the region which would have revealed that a substantional slave trade was in fact going on, especially within the pearl fish industry, were the slaves were particularly harshly treated.  

In 1936, the British finally acknowledged in their report to the League of Nations that there was still ongoing slavery and slave trade in the Trucial States, Oman and Qatar, but claimed that it was limited; that all slaves who sought asylum at the British Agents Office in Sharjah were granted manumission and that the slave trade had stopped entirely in Kuwait and Bahrain.  In reality, the British reports were deliberately playing down the size of the actual substantional slave trade going on in the region, and refused to allow international inspection.  In the 1940s, there were several suggestions made by the British to combat the slave trade and the slavery in the region, but none was considered enforceable.

Abolition

After World War II, there was a growing international pressure from the United Nations to end the slave trade. In 1948, the United Nations declared slavery to be a crime against humanity in the Universal Declaration of Human Rights, after which the Anti-Slavery Society pointed out that there were about one million slaves in the Arabian Peninsula, which was a crime against the 1926 Slavery Convention, and demanded that the UN form a committee to handle the issue. 

Slavery was abolished in 1949. After the abolition of slavery, poor migrant workers were employed under the Kafala system, which have been compared to slavery.Slavery in the United Arab Emirates

See also

 Human_rights_in_Oman#Domestic workers
 History of slavery in the Muslim world
 History of concubinage in the Muslim world
 Human trafficking in the Middle East
 Kafala system

References

 Joel Quirk: The Anti-Slavery Project: From the Slave Trade to Human Trafficking
 Jerzy Zdanowski:  Speaking With Their Own Voices: The Stories of Slaves in the Persian Gulf
 C.W.W. Greenidge:  Slavery
 William Clarence-Smith: Islam and the Abolition of Slavery

Kuwait
Kuwait
Islam and slavery
History of Kuwait